Dieter Schneider (born 20 October 1949 in Lauter, Saxony) is a former international football goalkeeper for the German Democratic Republic.

He played 279 matches in the East German top flight for FC Hansa Rostock.

Dieter Schneider, long-time understudy of Jürgen Croy, earned 3 caps for East Germany between 1969 and 1973. He was an unused part of the East Germany Olympic team in 1972 which won the bronze medal at the Munich games.

References

External links 
 
 
 
 Dieter Schneider at RSSSF

1949 births
Living people
People from Erzgebirgskreis
East German footballers
German footballers
Association football goalkeepers
Footballers from Saxony
Olympic bronze medalists for East Germany
East Germany international footballers
Footballers at the 1972 Summer Olympics